South Merton railway station is located in Morden, the administrative centre of the London Borough of Merton in South London. The station is served by Thameslink trains on the Sutton Loop Line. It is in Travelcard Zone 4.

History
Parliamentary approval for a line from Wimbledon to Sutton had been obtained by the Wimbledon and Sutton Railway (W&SR) in 1910 but work had been delayed by World War I. From the W&SR's inception, the District Railway (DR) was a shareholder of the company and had rights to run trains over the line when built. In the 1920s, the Underground Electric Railways Company of London (UERL, precursor of London Underground) planned, through its ownership of the DR and the City and South London Railway (C&SLR, now the Northern line), to use part of the W&SR's route for an extension of the C&SLR to Sutton. The SR objected and an agreement was reached that enabled the C&SLR to extend as far as Morden in exchange for the LER giving up its rights over the W&SR route. The SR subsequently built the line, one of the last to be built in the London area.

The station opened as the temporary terminus of the line when the first section opened from Wimbledon on 7 July 1929. The remainder of the line to Sutton opened on 5 January 1930.

Services
All services at South Merton are operated by Thameslink using  EMUs.

The typical off-peak service in trains per hour is:
 2 tph to 
 2 tph to 

Connections
London Bus routes 164 and 413 serve the station.

The station is also about an 800m walk away from Morden Underground Station which is served by the Northern line.

References

Bibliography

External links

Railway stations in the London Borough of Merton
Former Southern Railway (UK) stations
Railway stations in Great Britain opened in 1929
Railway stations served by Govia Thameslink Railway
Proposed London Underground stations
Morden